Year 1051 (MLI) was a common year starting on Tuesday (link will display the full calendar) of the Julian calendar.

Events 
 By place 

 Continental Europe 
 Spring – William of Normandy consolidates his power in Normandy. He fights over the control of Maine (after the death of Count Hugh IV), and lays siege to the fortresses of Alençon and Domfront (Western France). 
 May 19 – King Henry I of France marries Anne of Kiev at the cathedral of Reims. William of Normandy marries Matilda of Flanders, daughter of Count Baldwin V, which Henry sees as a threat to his throne.
 Summer – Drogo of Hauteville, count of Apulia and Calabria, meets Pope Leo IX in southern Italy – who has been sent by Emperor Henry III (the Black) to re-establish the "freedom of the Catholic Church". 
 Autumn – Henry III, Holy Roman Emperor invades the Kingdom of Hungary and gets utterly defeated by Andrew I of Hungary at the Battle of Vértes. 
 Drogo of Hauteville is forced to promise Leo IX to stop the Normans from pillaging the Lombard countryside. On his way back, Drogo is assassinated near Bovino by a Byzantine conspiracy.

 England 
 Eustace II, count of Boulogne, visits England and is received with honour at the court by King Edward the Confessor. In Dover a fight breaks out between the Norman visitors and the locals, resulting in the deaths of several people. Edward blames the people of Dover and orders Godwin, earl of Wessex, to deal with them. Godwin refuses to obey Edward's order, and in response Edward raises an army and forces the Godwin family into exile.
 Edward the Confessor invites William of Normandy to England. It is at this point that it is thought that Edward promises the English throne to William in the event of his death.
 Heregeld is abolished by Edward the Confessor. It has been collected for many years to provide funds for defending the country from Viking raiders.

 By topic 

 Religion 
 Hilarion of Kiev (or IIarion) becomes the first non-Greek metropolitan bishop of the Eastern Orthodox Church, in Kiev.

Births 
 September 21 – Bertha of Savoy, Holy Roman Empress (d. 1087)
 Cadwgan ap Bleddyn, prince of Powys (d. 1111)
 Edgar Ætheling, uncrowned king of England (d. c. 1126) 
 Robert II (Curthose), duke of Normandy (d. 1134)
 Mi Fu, Chinese painter, poet and calligrapher (d. 1107)

Deaths 
 January 22 – Ælfric Puttoc, archbishop of York
 February 28 – Humfrid, archbishop of Magdeburg
 March 14 – Gerard I, bishop of Cambrai
 March 25 – Hugh IV, count of Maine 
 April 27 – Fulk Bertrand I, count of Provence
 November 7 – Rotho, bishop of Paderborn
 Bardo, German abbot and archbishop 
 Bernard, margrave of the Nordmark
 Bi Sheng, Chinese artisan and inventor (b. 990)
 Drogo of Hauteville, Norman nobleman
 Jordan of Laron, bishop of Limoges
 Kálfr Árnason, Norwegian chieftain
 Ralph de Gacé, Norman nobleman

References